Survivor: Gabon — Earth's Last Eden is the seventeenth season of the American CBS competitive reality television series Survivor. The premiere aired September 25, 2008, with the first two episodes screened back-to-back. Survivor: Gabon began filming in late June. It marked the second season of the series that was filmed in Africa (Survivor: Africa had been filmed seven years earlier in Kenya). Reports from Gabon indicate the show was filmed around the coastal towns of Nyonie and Ekwata in the Wonga-Wongue Presidential Reserve.

This season, players sent to Exile Island had a choice of receiving a clue to the location of a Hidden Immunity Idol or a comfort item.  On April 13, 2008, at the National Association of Broadcasters's annual show, Sony announced that the 17th season of Survivor would be the first to be shot in high definition, using Sony's XDCAMs. The show ranked number ten in DVR playback (2.33 million viewers), according to Nielsen prime DVR lift data from September 22, 2008 – November 23, 2008.

The winner was 57-year-old Robert "Bob" Crowley, a high school physics teacher from Maine. He defeated Susie Smith and Jessica "Sugar" Kiper in a 4–3–0 vote at the live finale to take the million dollar prize. In addition, Bob won the $100,000 "Sprint Survivor of the Season" award, beating out Sugar and Matty Whitmore, who were next highest in the popular vote. Crowley is the oldest survivor winner to date, by both birthday and age at victory.

Contestants

This season started with 18 people divided into two tribes, Fang and Kota, named after ethnic groups in Gabon through a schoolyard pick. Former Dallas Cowboys head coach Jimmy Johnson was initially cast for this season, but was forced to drop out for medical reasons; he was replaced by Bob Crowley. Johnson went on to compete on Survivor: Nicaragua. Notable contestants from this season include former 2004 Olympic gold medalist Crystal Cox, professional gamer Ken Hoang, and Matty Whitmore, the grandson of actor James Whitmore.

Future appearances
Jessica "Sugar" Kiper and Randy Bailey returned for Survivor: Heroes vs. Villains. Corinne Kaplan returned for Survivor: Caramoan and later competed on The Amazing Race 31 with two-time Survivor contestant Eliza Orlins. In 2020, Marcus Lehman competed on FOX's Labor of Love.

Season summary
The players were divided into tribes by a schoolyard pick started by the oldest players, Bob and Gillian. It became evident that Gillian's tribe, Fang, was weaker, losing many of the reward and immunity challenges even after a tribal switch, but a core alliance between Matty, Ken, and Crystal developed. On Bob's tribe, Kota, a series of alliances were formed, strengthened after the swap with the addition of Randy. Both the hidden immunity idol and Exile Island were in play; the winning tribe on reward challenges was able to send one of the losing tribe's members to the latter. At Exile, that player had the option of a clue to the immunity idol hidden near Exile (ultimately leading to a string of hidden clues to the idol), or to relax in a small shack with a provision of fruit and a hammock. Sugar was the second player to visit Exile and found the idol on her first visit; she was repeatedly sent back to Exile, where, isolated from both tribes, she relaxed most of the time. Sugar's idol was eventually discovered by Matty, Ken, and Crystal, and they decided to bring her into their alliance, with Ken convincing her to vote off her closest ally Ace who he claimed was using her for the idol.

On Day 22, both tribes were given clues suggesting a tribal merge; they enjoyed a celebratory meal, and discovered a hidden immunity idol nearby. Unanimously, the players agreed to throw the idol away into the ocean. They then discovered they were still separate tribes, mixed by random draw, and returned to their camps. This development proved crucial for the minority Fang alliance, who successfully convinced Kota alliance member Susie that she was on the bottom of her alliance, resulting in the elimination of Kota alliance leader Marcus. The tribes were then merged with the former Kota alliance in the minority. The Fang alliance, now with Susie, dominated the game, eliminating the former Kota alliance until only Bob was left. Bob won three consecutive immunity challenges, forcing the Fang alliance to turn on themselves and resulting in the eliminations of Crystal and Ken due to their strong strategic prowess.

The final four were Matty, Sugar, Susie, and Bob. Susie won the final immunity challenge and ended Bob's immunity streak. Sugar decided to vote with Bob due to their social bond, forcing a tie between him and Matty; Bob won the fire-making tiebreaker challenge. 

At the Final Tribal Council, the jury criticized Sugar for her backstabbing, not owning her game, and playing with her emotions. Susie was praised for playing under the radar strategically, while Bob was praised for his physical game, creating two fake immunity idols, and having control of his fate. The jury voted Bob the Sole Survivor in a 4-3-0 vote over Susie and Sugar, respectively.

In the case of multiple tribes or castaways who win reward or immunity, they are listed in order of finish, or alphabetically where it was a team effort; where one castaway won and invited others, the invitees are in brackets.

Episodes

Voting history

Production notes
Probst recalled that the live finale of Gabon was almost ruined as the production assistant normally in charge of bringing the Final Tribal Council votes from the production offices to the live venue had forgotten to bring them, a fact discovered just as the live show started. Probst explained that another staff member raced back to the offices, breaking into the room where the votes were secured due to having no key, and faxed the votes over to the live venue, where another production staff member retraced the votes by hand with only about 15 minutes left before the live show vote reading. In the end, the original votes arrived at the studio in time and were read.

Reception
Survivor: Gabon was initially met with generally negative reception. Host Jeff Probst originally ranked Gabon 14th out of 19 seasons in 2010, thus ranking it as the sixth-worst season of the series. He later went on to say that the show was drifting during Gabon and that he nearly quit the show as a consequence. Dalton Ross of Entertainment Weekly ranked Gabon 28th out of 40, summarizing: "It got better near the end, but it was still a case of too little, too late. The fact that so many unworthy players went so far is simply too damning." Gabon is ranked as the second-worst season of the series by Examiner.com (only ahead of Survivor: Fiji), and The Wire (only ahead of Survivor: Redemption Island). "The Purple Rock Podcast" also ranked Gabon 34th out of 40, describing the cast as one of the most "inept Survivor casts ever from a gameplay perspective." In 2012 and 2013, Survivor fan site "Survivor Oz" consistently ranked Gabon as the eighth-worst season of the series in its annual polls ranking all seasons.

However, reception for Gabon has improved significantly in recent years. In 2014, it was voted the tenth-best season by "Survivor Oz". Its ranking improved substantially again in 2015, when it was ranked the seventh-best season. In 2015, a poll by Rob Has a Podcast ranked this season 23rd out of 30, with Rob Cesternino ranking this season 29th. This was updated in 2021 during Cesternino's podcast, Survivor All-Time Top 40 Rankings, ranking 26th out of 40. In 2020, Inside Survivor ranked this season 20th out of 40 saying that "the gameplay is completely baffling" but is "one of the most entertaining seasons of the show from a comedic perspective."

Controversy
Survivor: Gabon received some minor criticism from the Parents Television Council for a brief, uncensored glimpse of Marcus's penis when the tip was partially exposed through the fly of his boxer shorts. The exposure occurred on the season opener during the second Immunity Challenge when Marcus raced alongside fellow contestants.

References

External links
 Official CBS Survivor Gabon Website

17
2008 American television seasons
2008 in Gabon
Television shows filmed in Gabon